Zapro Dinev (born 25 September 1999) is a Bulgarian footballer who plays as a winger for Belasitsa Petrich.

References

External links
 

1999 births
Living people
Bulgarian footballers
Association football midfielders
First Professional Football League (Bulgaria) players
PFC Belasitsa Petrich players
Botev Plovdiv players
FC Vitosha Bistritsa players
FC Septemvri Simitli players
People from Petrich
Sportspeople from Blagoevgrad Province